The Li-Lao bronze drums or Heger type II drums are a type of ancient bronze drums found in Southern China and Northern Vietnam invented and used by Tai-Kadai-speaking (or specifically Tai-speaking) ethnic groups who were known to Chinese as Lǐ (俚) or Lǎo (獠) and who historically inhabited the Red River Delta from the 3rd to 8th century AD and later the Muong people, an ethnic minority in Northern Vietnam, from the 10th to 12th century. Classified by Franz Heger as type II to distinguish with the Dian-Dong Son drums or Heger type I, the Karen drum or Heger type III. Li-Lao drums were found in Guangdong, Guangxi, the Red River Delta and the Muong hills.  

The Li-Lao drums were known for unusual massive diameters and physical sizes. The biggest Li-Lao drum has a diameter of 150 cm (nearly double the size of the largest Dong Son drum). Despite that, decorations on Li-Lao drums are much lesser and impressive than their predecessor.

History
The Li-Lao drums were produced and used by the Li people and flourishing Li-Lao culture in Southern China and the Red River Delta of Vietnam, around ca. 200 AD to 750. Catherine Churchman geographically called them the People between two Rivers, i.e the Pearl River and the Red River.

It’s theorized by Michael and Catherine Churchman that the Li people began casting bronze drums around 40 AD, when according to Han dynasty sources, the Trung sisters’ revolt spread to Hepu (Guangxi) and sparked the local people to join the rebellion. Through this connection, the bronze drum manufacturing industry was transmitted from the Lac Viet to the Li. By 100 AD, while the Red River Delta no longer produced drums, in the Li homeland of Hepu, a new drum style and tradition was born.

Li-Lao drum culture flourished during the Six dynasties period of China and declined around the early Tang period. In 1902, Austrian archaeologist Franz Heger classified the Li-Lao drums as the Heger type II. He believed that the Li-Lao drums were descended from the Dian-Dongson drums.

Usage

The prosperity and autonomy society of the Li people, which mainly relied on the pearl trade, allowed them to cast numerous large drums. Because of its massive size, each Li-Lao drum weighs 150 kilograms would require double the number of copper ores (about 5,000 to 14,000 kilograms) and more labours to cast, compared to its Type I counterpart. In total, 215 type II drums are discovered in Guangxi and Guangdong.

Despite being sophisticated, the surfaces of Li-Lao drums are lesser in decorating, lack of detailed motifs that are identical to Heger I drums, such as mammals, birds, humans decorations, which creates a major difference between Heger type I drums and Li-Lao drums. Instead, they often carved geometric symbols on the surfaces, such as radiating sun, and sometimes, small toads. The handles are generally smaller and often (semi) circular. For centuries after that, bronze drums were highly symbolized as treasures of Li chieftains and to represent their nation's richness. The Li also brought bronze drums with them during battles and revolts against the Chinese.

The Sui Shu describes Lady Xian:

As late as the early 14th-century, Lê Tắc, a Đại Việt's official who had defected to the Yuan Mongol invaders, wrote in his 1335 Brief Records of Annam that bronze drums were forged, beaten, and valued by the Lǎozǐ (獠子), Tai-speakers as called by Chinese:

Notes

See also 
 Heger Type I drums

Notes

References

External links
 The Li-Lao drums

Bronze drums
Battle drums
Archaeology of China
Archaeology of Vietnam
Archaeological artifacts
Ancient Vietnam
Li people
1st millennium BC in Vietnam